The Treaty of Kyakhta was a tri-party treaty signed on 25 May 1915 among Russia, Mongolia, and China.

Russia and China recognized Outer Mongolia's autonomy (as part of Chinese territory); Mongolia recognized China's suzerainty; Mongolia could not conclude international treaties with foreign countries regarding political and territorial questions.

The Mongolian representative, Prime Minister Tögs-Ochiryn Namnansüren, was determined to stretch autonomy into de facto independence, and to deny the Chinese anything more than vague, ineffectual suzerain powers.  The Chinese sought to minimize, if not to end, Mongolian autonomy.

Mongolians viewed the treaty as a disaster because it denied the recognition of a truly independent, all-Mongolian state. Nevertheless, Outer Mongolia remained effectively outside Chinese control and, according to explanation by baron B.E. Nolde, the Director of Law Section of the Russian Foreign Ministry, had all necessary attributes of the state in the international law of that time.

The treaty severely curtailed the independent status of Mongolia declared in 1911, but eventually became moot after the October Revolution of 1917, and the declaration of the Mongolian People's Republic in 1921.

See also
Mongolian Revolution of 1911
Occupation of Mongolia
Simla Accord (1914)

References

Treaties concluded in 1915
Foreign relations of Mongolia
Treaties of Mongolia (1911–1924)
Treaties of the Russian Empire
Treaties of the Republic of China (1912–1949)
1910s in Mongolia
1915 in China
1910s in the Russian Empire
Kyakhta
China–Russian Empire relations